The double overhand noose is a very secure hitch knot. It might be used by cavers and canyoneers to bind a cow tail or a foot loop to a carabiner.

Details

A heavily tightened double overhand noose will jam. The bound object has to be removed before untying.

As the double overhand knot, it neither slips nor turns around. However, a third round turn might be useful with some highly lubricious spectra/nylon ropes.

See also
List of hitch knots
List of knots

Notes

References

Hitch knots